Straight Shooters is a 1947 American animated short film directed by Jack Hannah and produced by Walt Disney, featuring Donald Duck.

Plot
Donald Duck runs a shooting gallery at the carnival. His nephews come by dressed as band leaders and he offers them a free shot, but when the first one hits all the targets, the notoriously cheap Donald switches a cheap prize for the correct one, boxes of candy. He then gives the other two boys gimmicked guns; the last one is empty, but the targets break anyway because one boy is hitting them from behind. Donald chases them off, they use the mystic's booth next door to get revenge.

Voice cast
 Clarence Nash as Donald Duck, Huey, Dewey, and Louie

Music
This is the first Donald Duck cartoon to use the second opening theme in its intro.

Television
 Mickey's Mouse Tracks, episode #8
 Donald's Quack Attack, episode #70

Home media
The short was released on December 11, 2007, on Walt Disney Treasures: The Chronological Donald, Volume Three: 1947-1950.

Additional releases include:
 Walt Disney's Funny Factory': Volume 4, With Huey, Dewey, & Louie

References

External links
 Straight Shooters on IMDb
 Straight Shooters at The Internet Animation Database
 Straight Shooters on Filmaffinity

Donald Duck short films
Films produced by Walt Disney
1940s Disney animated short films
Films directed by Jack Hannah
1947 animated films
1947 films
Films scored by Oliver Wallace